Nadir Al Zoghbi (Arabic: ندير الزعبي) is a Syrian novelist, poet, and writer. He has published several books, novels, and short story collections including a collection of short stories titled “Ghosts of Pictures” published by House of Spaces. It included a collection of sentimental and literary texts. The author came with a hundred pages of medium pieces, and his cover was decorated with a set of plastic paintings. He also published a novel titled “32 Fahrenheits” issued by Arab House for Science Publishers, a book in the style of open literary forms. It combines poetry and novel, such as his novel “Euro”, In which the Syrian writer touched on several topics through the story of the euro. His novel "Abeel" played the largest role in the writer's fame, locally in Syria and in the Arab world, as well as in the rest of the Gulf countries and North Africa.

Career 
Nadir Al Zoghbi entered the world of writing and publishing in 2012. However, his most famous works were published in 2014 through the novel “Ten Nights and a Night”, Which was issued by the Arab House of Sciences Publishers. This novel belongs to a naturalized concept in the narrative style. Where the story penetrates time and place, and the narration summarizes indications that refer to the bygone time. It also refers to the present momentous events in the lives of the characters. Nazir spoke in this novel about the Abbasid era, specifically Laila, a perfume seller in the Abbasid state. He also moved to the present time, specifically Laila the Princess, in the clothes of the chambermaid in Baghdad, and the characters in between. Nazir writes about the issue of finding sculptures and a letter dating back to the Abbasid era during the reign of the Assyrian King Sennacherib.

The following year, Nadir Al Zoghbi published his collection of short stories "32 Fahrenheit" on the Arab House of Science. In this short story collection, Nazir talks about the Arab narrative heritage through his fictional characters, delivered through animals, plants, and things. The Syrian writer delves into adventures and mixes reality with fantasy. Nazir opened his collection with an allegory entitled (The Aquarium), during which he establishes a dialogue between small fish and large fish. Humans locked them in the basin, which the author uses to symbolize the great prison that gathers humans in this life without knowing it, making them think they are free. The book included twenty short stories: “The Sink”, “Light”, “Coffee Cup”, “Box”, “Matchstick”, “Poetry’s Tongue”, “Solo”, “Fur”, “Polar Bear and Refrigerator”, “Chatter”. "First Bullet", "Bouchard", "Last Call", "Sound of Silence", "Peace", "Not a pipe", "Abracadabra", "Kisdor", "Squirrel and Cherries", and "32 Fahrenheit".

In the same year, Al Zoghbi published a second collection of short stories entitled “Ghosts of Pictures” by Fadaat for publishing and distributing. He followed it by the book titled “Euro”, published by The Arab House of Science Publishers, which the Syrian writer collaborated with on more than one occasion. In this book, Nadir tried to answer questions that make a person consider things from a different perspective and realize the value of the little details that we seldom contemplate. The author stated in a subsequent press interview that in this book he moved readers to a contemplative world that is passionate about minute details. It suggests that they should look at things from ambivalent sides, using their senses in addition to their vision, as they may see things that they had not noticed before. Al Zoghbi posed many questions without being followed by clear question marks, by highlighting a coin, the euro, that roams the cities, moving from pocket to pocket, and from hand to hand.

The novel "Abeel", which was published by the House of Culture for Publishing and Distribution on the fifteenth of March 2019, is considered to be his most famous work. In it, Nadir writes about a man who suffers from “pituitary gigantism” and was endowed with a large body, great height, and a bloody face that made him fear people's eyes, as he became a subject for ridicule and mockery. But at the same time, his strange appearance will make him the subject of a scoop, the title of a novel project, a painting, and the hero of an international movie about giants, which made journalists and TV presenters flock to him for interviews. However, all this did not take away the painful feeling that he will never be like the rest of mankind.

Works 

 Euro
 Ten Nights and a Night
 Ghosts of Pictures
 32 Fahrenheit
 Abeel

References 

Syrian writers
Arab novelists
Year of birth missing (living people)
Living people